Ojo de Agua may refer to:

Ojo de Agua, Dominican Republic, a village near Salcedo that was home to the Mirabal sisters
Ojos de Agua, Comayagua, a municipality in Honduras
Ojo de Agua, Tecámac, a neighborhood in Tecámac, State of Mexico
Ojo de Agua (Mexibús), a BRT station in Tecamac, Mexico
Ojo de Agua, Chiapas, a town in Mazatán, Chiapas, Mexico
Ojo de Agua, a spring in El Parterre plaza, Aguadilla, Puerto Rico